Chelostoma philadelphi is a species of hymenopteran in the family Megachilidae. It is found in North America.

References

Further reading

External links

 

Megachilidae
Articles created by Qbugbot
Insects described in 1891